Suraxanı or Surakhany may refer to:

 Suraxanı raion, an administrative district in Baku, Azerbaijan
 Suraxanı (town), the administrative center of the raion
 Suraxanı, Agsu, a village and municipality in Agsu Rayon, Azerbaijan